1424 Sundmania is a large asteroid and rather slow rotator from the background population of the outer regions of the asteroid belt. It was discovered on 9 January 1937, by astronomer Yrjö Väisälä at the Turku Observatory in southwest Finland. It was named after Finnish astronomer and mathematician Karl F. Sundman.

Orbit and classification 

Sundmania is a non-family asteroid of the main belt's background population when applying the hierarchical clustering method to its proper orbital elements. It orbits the Sun in the outer main-belt at a distance of 3.0–3.4 AU once every 5 years and 8 months (2,081 days). Its orbit has an eccentricity of 0.06 and an inclination of 9° with respect to the ecliptic.

Naming 

This minor planet was named after Finnish mathematician Karl F. Sundman (1873–1949), who intensively worked on the n-body problem. Sundman worked as an astronomer at several observatories all over Europe. He became director of the Helsinki University Observatory and was appointed professor of astronomy at the University of Helsinki in 1907. The asteroids 1558 Järnefelt and 1559 Kustaanheimo were also named after astronomers from the University of Helsinki. The  was mentioned in The Names of the Minor Planets by Paul Herget in 1955. The lunar crater Sundman was also named in his honor.

Physical characteristics 

In the SMASS classification, Sundmania is an X-type asteroid. It has also been characterized as a primitive P-type by the Wide-field Infrared Survey Explorer (WISE). The Lightcurve Data Base assumes it to be a carbonaceous C-type asteroid.

Rotation period 

Sundmania is a rather slow rotator as most minor planets have a rotation period of less than 20 hours.

In April 2012, a rotational lightcurve of Sundmania was obtained from photometric observations by American astronomer Robert Stephens at the Goat Mountain Astronomical Research Station  in California. Lightcurve analysis gave a rotation period of 93.73 hours with a brightness amplitude of 0.42 magnitude. Observations by French amateur astronomers Laurent Bernasconi and René Roy gave a period of 36 and 47 hours, of which the latter seems to be half the period solution obtained by Stephens.

Spin axis 

In 2016, an international study modeled a lightcurve with a period of  hours and found two spin axes of (51.0°, 76.0°) and (275.0°, 58.0°) in ecliptic coordinates (λ, β).

Diameter and albedo 

According to the surveys carried out by the Infrared Astronomical Satellite IRAS, the Japanese Akari satellite and the NEOWISE mission of NASA's WISE telescope, Sundmania measures between 64.691 and 84.67 kilometers in diameter and its surface has an albedo between 0.030 and 0.0602. The Collaborative Asteroid Lightcurve Link derives an albedo of 0.0426 and a diameter of 70.56 kilometers based on an absolute magnitude of 9.8.

References

External links 
 Lightcurve Database Query (LCDB), at www.minorplanet.info
 Dictionary of Minor Planet Names, Google books
 Asteroids and comets rotation curves, CdR – Geneva Observatory, Raoul Behrend
 Discovery Circumstances: Numbered Minor Planets (1)-(5000) – Minor Planet Center
 
 

001424
Discoveries by Yrjö Väisälä
Named minor planets
001424
19370109